Anderson Township, Nebraska may refer to the following places in Nebraska:

Anderson Township, Phelps County, Nebraska
Anderson Township, Thurston County, Nebraska

See also
Anderson Township (disambiguation)

Nebraska township disambiguation pages